The Renault Kadjar is a compact crossover SUV (C-segment) manufactured and marketed by Renault, developed with the second generation Nissan Qashqai/Rogue Sport and revealed at the 2015 Geneva Motor Show, with sales starting in April 2015 in Europe, and in 2016 in China.

The Kadjar was superseded by the Renault Austral which commenced production in 2022, and utilises only E-Tech mild hybrid or PHEV petrol drivetrains. It is expected to become the successor to the Kadjar/Koleos/Scénic and Grand Scénic/Espace SUV and MPV model lines in 5 and 7 seat forms respectively.

Overview

The Kadjar shares the same Renault–Nissan Common Module Family platform as the Nissan Qashqai, which will allow for front and four wheel drive.

It is offered with the latest version of Renault's R Link 2 infotainment system (voice control, navigation, Bluetooth and radio), engine stop start, emergency brake assist, lane departure warning and traffic sign recognition with speed limit alerts, 360 degree sensors, reversing camera, and a hands free parking system.

The 108 bhp 1.5 litre diesel is the most economical model offered, with  emissions of 99g/km and fuel economy of 74.3mpg. Final performance figures are not yet confirmed, but offers much the same levels as the Qashqai, with 0–62 mph (100 km/h) coming in 11.9 seconds.

The 128 bhp 1.6 litre diesel makes it from 0–62 mph (100 km/h) in 9.9 seconds, emit 115g/km and average 64mpg. Performance and economy figures are said to be largely similar for both automatic and manual versions. The 4WD version has slightly higher emissions. A 128 bhp 1.2 TCe petrol model is also offered.

Renault claims the Kadjar name is based on two words: Kad is inspired by quad to represent a go anywhere four wheeled vehicle, and Jar recalls the French words agile and jaillir respectively representing agility and suddenly emerging from somewhere.

Renault published a more elaborate explanation of the name Kadjar in the blog section of their corporate web site. However, its relation to Qashqai points to its relation to the Qajars or in French Kadjars.

Since Nasser ed-Din Shah the Qajar shahs of Persia wrote their name in western script in the French way: Kadjar. This relation has been noted in several professional and social media in prevalently neutral, but in few cases, a bit enthusiastic manner. There were also rare bursts of politically based outrage.

According to two Iranian sources, Mozaffar ad-Din Shah Qajar King of Iran (1853–1907), acquired two Renault cars in Belgium in 1900 while on his trip in Europe, and had them delivered to Iran. These were to be the first automobiles in Iran.

The car received a facelift in 2018, with production of the remodeled car starting some time the following year. With four new engines to replace the old, a change to the exterior design and an updated interior with more space for items, updated infotainment system and some small changes to the climate control.

The Kadjar production was stopped mid-July 2022.

Engines

The cylinder head of the 1.3L direct-injection turbo petrol motor was designed by Daimler, utilising a rare compact triangular "Delta" design. It incorporates a bore spray coating, a petrol particulate filter in the exhaust system, and the Mercedes application in the A-Class adds cylinder deactivation.

Prompted by the Volkswagen emissions scandal, the German motor authority found many cars not complying with the requirements of the emission laws. The Kadjar's diesel dCi 110 and dCi 130 (2015-2018) engines were measured to have a  emission level of approximately 1.5 g/km, almost twenty times the Euro 6 limit of 80 mg/km.

Safety features

Renault Kadjar had five-star Euro NCAP rating in 2015.

On the British market, entry-level model does not have lane departure warning.
Lane departure warning feature is available on medium model.
Top model also has speed alert with traffic sign recognition and a blind spot warning system.

Depending on model, reversing sensors, front sensors and a reversing camera might be available.

Sales 

685,261 Kadjar have been produced overall.

References

External links
 (UK)

Kadjar
Compact sport utility vehicles
Crossover sport utility vehicles
All-wheel-drive vehicles
Euro NCAP small off-road
2010s cars
Cars introduced in 2015
Vehicles with CVT transmission